Diplotaenia is a genus of flowering plants belonging to the family Apiaceae.

Its native range is Turkey to Iran.

Species:

Diplotaenia bingolensis 
Diplotaenia cachrydifolia 
Diplotaenia damavandica 
Diplotaenia hayri-dumanii 
Diplotaenia turcica

References

Apioideae